is a Japanese professional footballer who plays for Vissel Kobe and the Japan national team as a forward.

Club career

1860 Munich
On 6 January 2014, Osako joined German side TSV 1860 Munich for the second half of the 2014–2015 season. He scored on his debut, the opener in a 1–1 draw against Fortuna Düsseldorf. He finished the season with 6 goals in 15 appearances.

1. FC Köln
In June 2014, Osako transferred to 1. FC Köln signing a three-year contract. It was reported Kashima Antlers received a transfer fee of €1.5 million while 1860 Munich earned €500,000. In October 2016, he agreed a contract extension until summer 2020 with Köln. On 28 April 2018, he played as Köln lost 3–2 to SC Freiburg which confirmed their relegation from the Bundesliga.

Werder Bremen
On 16 May 2018, it was announced that Osako would join Werder Bremen for the 2018–19 season. He scored on his debut on 19 August 2018, netting the first goal with a header in a 6–1 win against Wormatia Worms in the first round of the DFB-Pokal.

In February 2019, he was voted the 2018 Japanese Footballer of the Year.

Vissel Kobe
Osako returned to Japan in August 2021, joining Vissel Kobe.

International career
In May 2018, he was named in the Japan national team's preliminary squad for the 2018 World Cup in Russia. In the opening match against Colombia, he scored the second goal for Japan by a header, thus helping Japan become the first Asian team to beat a South American team in the World Cup history. He also appeared for Japan in the 2019 AFC Asian Cup hosted by the United Arab Emirates. He scored four goals to help them reach the final, where they eventually lost to Qatar, 3–1.

Career statistics

Club

1Includes AFC Champions League.
2Includes Japanese Super Cup, Suruga Bank Championship and Bundesliga relegation play-offs.

International

Scores and results list Japan's goal tally first, score column indicates score after each Osako goal.

Honours
Kashima Antlers
 J.League Division 1: 2009
 Emperor's Cup: 2010
 J.League Cup: 2011, 2012
 Japanese Super Cup: 2009, 2010
 Suruga Bank Championship: 2012, 2013

Japan
 EAFF East Asian Cup: 2013
 AFC Asian Cup Runner-up: 2019

Individual
 Japanese Footballer of the Year: 2018
 J.League Cup MVP: 2011
 J.League Cup top scorer: 2012
 AFC Asian Cup Team of the Tournament: 2019

References

External links

 
 
 
 
 Yuya Osako – Yahoo! Japan sports 
 Sponichi 

1990 births
Living people
Association football people from Kagoshima Prefecture
Japanese footballers
Association football forwards
Kashima Antlers players
TSV 1860 Munich players
1. FC Köln players
SV Werder Bremen players
Vissel Kobe players
J1 League players
Bundesliga players
2. Bundesliga players
Japanese Footballer of the Year winners
Japan youth international footballers
Japan international footballers
2014 FIFA World Cup players
2018 FIFA World Cup players
2019 AFC Asian Cup players
Japanese expatriate footballers
Japanese expatriate sportspeople in Germany
Expatriate footballers in Germany